The Life of St. Sava was the biography of Saint Sava (1169–1236), the first Archbishop of Serbs (s. 1219–1235), written by Serbian monk Domentijan (1210–after 1264) in 1254. Serbian monk Teodosije the Hilandarian wrote a second biography of Saint Sava.

See also
List of medieval Serbian literature

Further reading
 
 
 

Medieval Serbian literature
13th century in Serbia
1254
1250s books
Nemanjić dynasty
History of the Serbian Orthodox Church
Works about religious leaders
13th-century history books
13th-century Christian texts
Serbian manuscripts
Cyrillic manuscripts
Christian hagiography